Kensett Township is a township in Worth County, Iowa, USA.

History
Kensett Township was established in 1876.

References

Townships in Worth County, Iowa
Townships in Iowa